The 1973 NCAA Indoor Track and Field Championships were contested March 9−10, 1973 at Cobo Arena in Detroit, Michigan at the ninth annual NCAA-sanctioned track meet to determine the individual and team national champions of men's collegiate indoor track and field events in the United States.

Manhattan topped the team standings, the Jaspers' first indoor team title (and only NCAA championship in any sport).

Qualification
Unlike other NCAA-sponsored sports, there were not separate University Division and College Division championships for indoor track and field until 1985. As such, all athletes and teams from University and College Division programs were eligible to compete.

Team standings 
 Note: Top 10 only
 (DC) = Defending Champions
 Full results

References

NCAA Indoor Track and Field Championships
Ncaa Indoor Track And Field Championships
Ncaa Indoor Track And Field Championships
NCAA Indoor Track and Field Championships